Labour Relations (Public Service) Convention, 1978 is  an International Labour Organization Convention.

It was established in 1978, with the preamble stating:
Having decided upon the adoption of certain proposals with regard to freedom of association and procedures for determining conditions of employment in the public service,...

Ratifications
As of November 2022, the convention has been ratified by 57 states:

References

External links 
Text.
Ratifications.

Civil services
International Labour Organization conventions
Treaties concluded in 1978
Treaties entered into force in 1981
Treaties of Albania
Treaties of Antigua and Barbuda
Treaties of Argentina
Treaties of Armenia
Treaties of Azerbaijan
Treaties of Belarus
Treaties of Belgium
Treaties of Belize
Treaties of Botswana
Treaties of Brazil
Treaties of Chad
Treaties of Chile
Treaties of Colombia
Treaties of Cuba
Treaties of Cyprus
Treaties of Denmark
Treaties of El Salvador
Treaties of Finland
Treaties of Gabon
Treaties of Georgia (country)
Treaties of Ghana
Treaties of Greece
Treaties of Guinea
Treaties of Guyana
Treaties of Hungary
Treaties of Italy
Treaties of Latvia
Treaties of Luxembourg
Treaties of North Macedonia
Treaties of Madagascar
Treaties of Mali
Treaties of Moldova
Treaties of Morocco
Treaties of the Netherlands
Treaties of Norway
Treaties of Peru
Treaties of the Polish People's Republic
Treaties of Portugal
Treaties of Russia
Treaties of San Marino
Treaties of São Tomé and Príncipe
Treaties of Seychelles
Treaties of Slovakia
Treaties of Slovenia
Treaties of Spain
Treaties of Suriname
Treaties of Sweden
Treaties of Switzerland
Treaties of Tunisia
Treaties of Turkey
Treaties of the United Kingdom
Treaties of Uruguay
Treaties of Zambia
Treaties extended to Guernsey
Treaties extended to Gibraltar
Treaties extended to Jersey
Treaties extended to Montserrat
Treaties extended to the Isle of Man
1978 in labor relations